The 1987 Athens Trophy was a women's tennis tournament played on outdoor clay courts in Athens in Greece. Further, it was part of the 1987 Virginia Slims World Championship Series. It was held from 5 October until 11 October 1987. Katerina Maleeva won the singles title.

Finals

Singles

 Katerina Maleeva defeated  Julie Halard 6–0, 6–1
 It was Maleeva's 2nd title of the year and the 5th of her career.

Doubles

 Andrea Betzner /  Judith Wiesner defeated  Kathleen Horvath /  Dianne van Rensburg 6–4, 7–6
 It was Betzner's only title of the year and the 1st of her career. It was Wiesner's only title of the year and the 1st of her career.

See also
 1987 Athens Open – men's tournament

References

Athens Trophy
Athens Trophy
Athens Trophy